This is an incomplete list of television programmes, past and present, screened on Television New Zealand that were made in New Zealand.

Programmes

Regular shows (screened throughout the year)

Seasonal shows

One-off series
Shows that screened intentionally for just one season or for just a few weeks.

Cancelled/ended programmes

Specials
The TV2's 2003, a television special documenting a short film competition

References

External links
 New Zealand on air television programme catalogue

 
TVNZ